Philippe-Jacques Abraham (Orahim Pillipus Yaqub) (January 3, 1848 – August 28, 1915) was an ethnic Assyrian bishop of the Chaldean Catholic Church.

He was born in Telkef in 1848. He joined the Rabban Hormizd Monastery at a young age where he pursued his clerical studies and was consecrated as a bishop by the Syro-Malabar Church in British India on 25 July 1875. Seven years later he was consecrated as a bishop for the Chaldeans of the Jazira region by Joseph VI Audo.

During the Assyrian genocide he tried to ask for protection from the local Kurdish Agha to spare the city's Christians. His efforts were ultimately futile and he was arrested by the Ottoman authorities on 21 August 1915. The authorities had him executed a week later alongside the Syriac Catholic bishop Flavianus Michael Malke and his body was dragged in the town's streets.

See also
Addai Scher

Notes

1848 births
1915 deaths
People from Tel Keppe
Assyrians from the Ottoman Empire
Chaldean bishops
20th-century Roman Catholic martyrs
People who died in the Assyrian genocide
20th-century Eastern Catholic martyrs